Saint Rodingus (or Radingus, Ronin, Rouin; died ) was an Irish monk and abbot in Beaulieu-en-Argonne, France.
His feast day is 17 September.

Monks of Ramsgate account

The monks of St Augustine's Abbey, Ramsgate wrote in their Book of Saints (1921),

Butler's account

The hagiographer Alban Butler (1710–1773) wrote in his Lives of the Fathers, Martyrs, and Other Principal Saints under September 17,

Notes

Sources

 
 

French Roman Catholic saints
680 deaths